The Moračnik Monastery is a Serbian Orthodox monastery on Moračnik island on Skadar Lake in modern-day Montenegro. It is positioned across from the village of Bobovište, whose residents used it as their church before they converted to Islam.

History 
The name of the monastery is derived from the name of the island. The monastery was mentioned in the chapter issued by Balša III in 1417 by which he granted a salt evaporation pond to the monastery. It was built after 1400, probably between 1403 and 1417. The monastery was so poor in the 17th century that in 1665 its hegumen, together with hegumen and monks from Vranjina Monastery, requested help from Catholic bishop of Scutari Pjetër Bogdani. During Montenegrin-Ottoman war in 1853 monastery was attacked by Ottoman forces. Defended by three Leković brothers: Mališa, Savo and Andrija  from the nearby Godinje village who were badly outnumbered, it was eventually captured while his defenders according to a local folklore died a heroic death. Until 1997, when the first liturgy was done, the monastery was defunct. Pavel Rovinsky thought that this monastery was part of nearby Prečista Krajinska Monastery.

Layout 

The monastery was surrounded by
a stone wall and consisted of the following buildings: a church dedicated to the Holy Mother of God, residence, communal dining-hall and a tower with a chapel on top.

See also 
List of Serb Orthodox monasteries

References

Further reading 

 

Religious buildings and structures completed in 1417
15th-century Serbian Orthodox church buildings
Serbian Orthodox monasteries in Montenegro
Bar, Montenegro
Medieval Montenegro
Medieval Serbian Orthodox monasteries